Chad Redman (born 17 December 1992) is an Australian professional rugby league footballer who currently plays for the Cessnock Goannas in the Newcastle Rugby League.

Background
Born in Newcastle, New South Wales, Redman played his junior rugby league for the Western Suburbs Rosellas in the Newcastle Rugby League, before being signed by the Newcastle Knights.

Playing career

Early career
In 2010, Redman played for the Australian Schoolboys. From 2010 to 2012, he played for the Newcastle Knights' NYC team, before moving on to the Knights' New South Wales Cup team in 2013.

2015
In Round 10 of the 2015 NRL season, Redman made his NRL debut for the Knights against the Wests Tigers, scoring a try on debut. On 16 June, he joined the Gold Coast Titans mid-season for the rest of the year to try and play regular first-grade, stating "Newcastle will always be home to me, but this was too big an opportunity to knock back. I'd be kicking myself if I did knock it back then didn't get another shot at Newcastle for the rest of the year with the line-up that they've got here and where I fit in that." He made his Titans debut in Round 15 against the New Zealand Warriors. He went on to play in 5 games for the Titans before being released at the end of the year and signing with the Burleigh Bears in the Queensland Cup.

2016
In 2016, Redman opted to instead return to his junior club Western Suburbs Rosellas in the Newcastle Rugby League rather than staying with the Burleigh Bears.

References

External links

Gold Coast Titans profile

1992 births
Living people
Australian rugby league players
Burleigh Bears players
Cessnock Goannas players
Gold Coast Titans players
Newcastle Knights players
Rugby league hookers
Rugby league players from Newcastle, New South Wales
Western Suburbs Rosellas players